Almosi is a village and jamoat in Tajikistan. It is part of the city of Hisor in Districts of Republican Subordination. The jamoat has a total population of 21,261 (2015).

References

Populated places in Districts of Republican Subordination
Jamoats of Tajikistan